= Anak Kayan =

Malaysian folk music orchestra

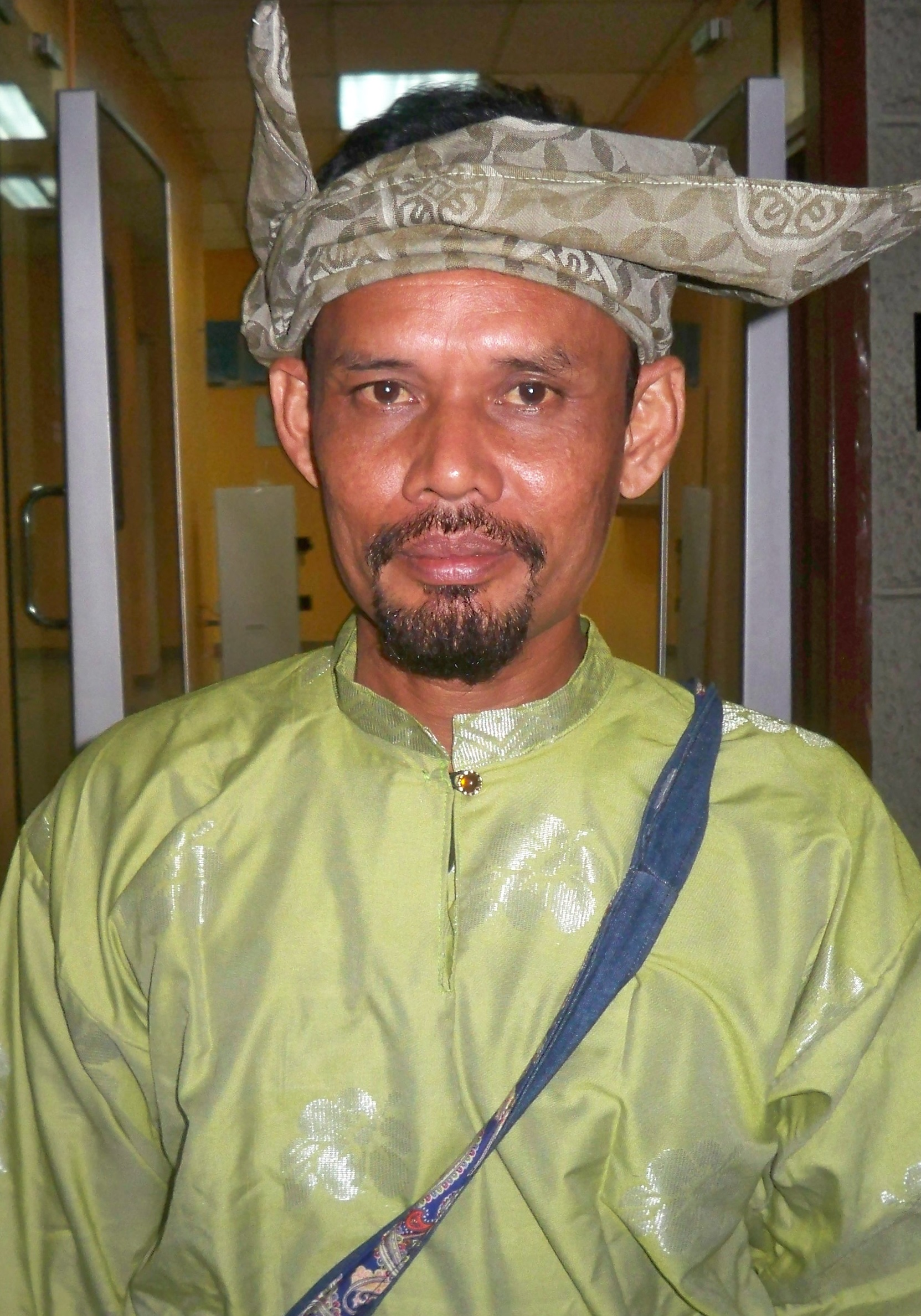
- Man Kayan, the founder of the group, in Kuala Lumpur, January 30, 2018

Background information
- Origin: Kuantan, Malaysia
- Genres: folk
- Years active: 2010 – present
- Members: Man Kayan (founder)

Anak Kayan (Children of Kayan) is a folk music orchestra in Malaysia established in 2010 in Kuantan, Pahang. The founder of the group is Noor Azman b. Norawi, better known by his pseudonym Man Kayan.

The orchestra consists of 15 musicians playing traditional Malay instruments (various drums and gongs) and performing folk songs and melodies. The group actively tours the country. It participated many times in the Pangkor International Poetry and Folk Song Festival.

== Awards ==
- World Homestay Organization Summit for Tourism's Partner (January 27, 2019)

== See also ==
- Anak Kayan - Berakit Di Sungai Pahang
